DNA is the ninth studio album (eighth in the US) by the Backstreet Boys. The album was first released in Japan on January 23, 2019, and everywhere else on January 25, 2019, through a collaboration with the group's own K-BAHN record label and RCA Records. The album features tracks written by Edei, Lauv, Andy Grammer, Stuart Crichton, Ryan Tedder and Shawn Mendes. This is the group's second album, after 2007's Unbreakable, without involvement from longtime producers and friends Max Martin and Kristian Lundin. It also serves as the follow-up to their eighth studio album (seventh in the US) In a World Like This (2013). It was preceded by the singles "Don't Go Breaking My Heart", "Chances", "No Place", and is supported by the  DNA World Tour, which is the band's most expansive in 18 years. The tour began on May 11, 2019, in Lisbon, Portugal, before visiting North America in July 2019. The album is their first on one of  Sony Music's subsidiary companies after In a World Like This was released independently through BMG. It debuted at number one on the US Billboard 200, becoming the Backstreet Boys' third number-one album there and the first since Black & Blue in 2000.

Background and promotion
A press release stated that the group "analyzed their individual DNA profiles to see what crucial element each member represents in the group's DNA". Kevin Richardson said of the album: "We were able to bring all of our influences and styles into one coherent piece of work. These songs are a great representation of who we are as individuals and who we are as a group. It's our DNA. We're really proud of that." DNA is also short for "Digital and Analog" which is how the boys started recording in the 1990s.

The group announced the name of the album and its release date on November 9, 2018. The same day, they also released the single "Chances" and announced the DNA World Tour in support of the album, which began in May 2019.

Critical reception

DNA received mostly positive reviews from music critics. At Metacritic, which assigns a normalized rating out of 100 to reviews from mainstream critics, the album has an average score of 67 based on 4 reviews, indicating "generally favorable reviews".

Commercial performance
DNA debuted at number one on the US Billboard 200 with 234,000 album-equivalent units, of which 227,000 were pure album sales. It is the Backstreet Boys' third number-one album and first in 19 years, the last being Black & Blue (2000). It also makes this their eighth consecutive top-ten album following In a World Like This (2013), and set the group's record of generating number-one albums for three consecutive decades (1990-2010).

In Canada, the album debuted at number one with over 46,000 first week sales. On January 3, 2020 the album was certified platinum with over 80,000 sales. This is also the 5th highest-selling album in Canada in 2019 in terms of physical copies.

As of January 20, 2020, the album sold over 416,000 copies in the US.

Track listing
Credits adapted from Apple Music.

Notes
  signifies an additional producer
  signifies a vocal producer

Personnel
Credits adapted from album’s liner notes.

Backstreet Boys
 Nick Carter
 Howie Dorough
 Brian Littrell
 AJ McLean
 Kevin Richardson

Additional personnel

 Mitch Allan – vocal production (track 5)
 Ed Boyer – mixing (track 3)
 Ben Bram – producer, arranger, engineer, and additional vocals (track 3)
 Ross Copperman – producer, engineer, mixing, programming, guitars, and keyboards (track 11)
 Serge Courtois – mixing (track 8)
 Stuart Crichton – producer, beats, and programming (tracks 1, 9, 10, 12); engineer (tracks 1, 9, 10); piano and synthesizers (track 1); vocal producer (track 6)
 Josh Ditty – assistant engineer (track 11)
 Eric J. Dubowsky – mixing (tracks 9, 10, 12)
 Serban Ghenea – mixing (tracks 1, 4, 7)
 Josh Gudwin – mixing (tracks 2, 5, 6)
 John Hanes – mix engineer (tracks 1, 4, 7)
 Kuk Harrell – vocal production (tracks 4, 7)
 Jamie Hartman – producer, engineer, piano, synthesizers, and bass (track 1)
 Erik Hassle – electric piano (track 4)
 Hunter Jackson – mixing assistant (tracks 2, 5, 6)
 Steve James – producer (track 2)
 Josh Kear – additional production (track 11)
 Scott Kelly – assistant engineer (track 7)
 Joe Kirkland – guitar (track 12)
 Ian Kirkpatrick – producer, engineer, instruments, and programming (track 6)
 Dave Kutch – mastering
 Ari Leff – additional production (track 2)
 Elof Loelv – producer, instrumentation, programming, and engineer (track 4)
 Elijah Marrett-Hitch – mixing assistant (tracks 2, 5, 6)
 Ryan Ogren – producer (track 2)
 David Phelan – engineer (track 4)
 Michael Pollack – additional keyboards (track 9)
 Rich Rich – engineer (track 7)
 Zach Skelton – producer, guitar, drums, keyboards, and programming (track 7)
 Casey Smith – backing vocals (track 7)
 Steven Solomon – producer, guitar, bass, and programming (track 8)
 Garrison Starr – guitar (track 10)
 The Stereotypes – producers (track 5)
 Ryan Tedder – producer and additional programming (track 7)
 Simone Torres – vocal engineer (tracks 4, 7)
 Jake Troth – additional production (track 4)
 Tim Watt – mixing assistant (tracks 9, 10, 12)
 The Wiild – producer (track 5)

Charts

Weekly charts

Year-end charts

Certifications

Release history

References

2019 albums
Albums produced by Ryan Tedder
Backstreet Boys albums
RCA Records albums